Raphune is a settlement on the island of Saint Thomas in the United States Virgin Islands.

The Al Cohen's Plaza mall is located in Raphune.

References

Populated places in Saint Thomas, U.S. Virgin Islands
Southside, Saint Thomas, U.S. Virgin Islands